Swee-Touch-Nee Tea is a brand of orange pekoe black tea founded in approximately 1880 by the now-dissolved Consolidated Tea Company Inc, one of the oldest Jewish companies in America.

Swee-Touch-Nee Tea derives its name from the loose Russian transliteration of “tsvetochnyy chay” which translates to "flowery tea." On older tins, the name was written in Cyrillic (Цвѣточный Чай) with the transliteration/translation "Zvetouchny Tea."

History 

Swee-Touch-Nee Tea was established in approximately 1880 by Samuel Zechnowitz (1865-1942) a Jewish merchant from Nyasvizh, Belarus and a founding member of The Forward. Fleeing antisemitism in the Russian Empire, Zechnowitz immigrated to New York in the early 1880s and settled in Brooklyn, New York. The tea company, then in its infancy, arrived with him. 

The Consolidated Tea Company was formed in 1911 to take over the Columbia Tea Co. Consolidated imported and packaged tea, which included the Swee-Touch-Nee brand. An article in the Jewish Daily Forward dated February 25, 1931 describes the Consolidated Tea Company as "the oldest Jewish company in America."

Upon his death in 1942, Samuel Zechnowitz’s nephew Jacob Zechnowitz (1886-1965) became president of the company. In 1966, The Consolidated Tea Company moved from its original headquarters in Brooklyn to Lynbrook, NY, where it continued to be a family-owned and operated business for a further 50 years. In 2015, The Consolidated Tea Company was dissolved and the Swee-Touch-Nee Tea brand was purchased by another company.

The Consolidated Tea Company previously produced a variety of discontinued Swee-Touch-Nee Tea products including: Green tea, flavored iced teas, powdered iced tea mix, hot cocoa, and an assortment of flavored tea bags.

Significance in Jewish-American culture

Kosher tea 
Swee-Touch-Nee Tea is a certified kosher product and is also available kosher for Passover.

The red and gold tins 
Swee-Touch-Nee Tea was originally packaged in red and gold steamer trunk-style tins that would soon become a familiar item in many Jewish American households, particularly New York City and the surrounding areas. The company switched to red and gold cardboard packaging in the late 1960s. Original Swee-Touch-Nee Tea tins are held in collections at the Jewish Museum (Manhattan), the National Museum of American History, and the Jewish Museum of Maryland.

Vintage Swee-Touch-Nee Tea tins are considered collectors items and can occasionally be found in antique stores and online marketplaces throughout the world. Swee-Touch-Nee Tea tins dated from the late 1880s until 1913 are labelled in the original Russian script. Tins from 1913 until 1917 are labelled in both English and Russian. Following the 1917 Russian Revolution, Swee-Touch-Nee Tea tins were produced with only English text, a result of the negative public sentiment surrounding the antisemitic trope of Jewish Bolshevism.

In popular culture 
A Swee-Touch-Nee Tea box is shown in Season 1, Episode 8 of the TV series Archive 81.

References 

Tea brands in the United States
History of the Jews in the Americas
1880 establishments in the United States